The Talbot Formation is a geologic formation in Maryland. It preserves fossils dating back to the Neogene period.

See also

 List of fossiliferous stratigraphic units in Maryland
 Paleontology in Maryland

References
 

Geologic formations of Maryland